Villy Haugen (born 27 September 1944) is a former speed skater from Norway.

Haugen earned a bronze medal in 1500 m. at the 1964 Winter Olympics in Innsbruck. He came on eighth place on 500 m at the same Olympics. Haugen represented SK Falken in Trondheim.

Personal records
41,1 - 1.25,0 - 2.09,9 - 4.42,4 - 8.17,5 - 17.47,2

References

External links
Villy Haugen at SpeedSkatingStats.com

1944 births
Living people
People from Leksvik
Norwegian male speed skaters
Olympic bronze medalists for Norway
Olympic speed skaters of Norway
Speed skaters at the 1964 Winter Olympics
Olympic medalists in speed skating
Medalists at the 1964 Winter Olympics
Sportspeople from Trøndelag